Peter Nicholas Duranko (December 15, 1943 – July 8, 2011) was a college and professional American football player.  A defensive end, he played college football at the University of Notre Dame, and his professional career for the Denver Broncos. He had also been drafted by the Cleveland Browns.  Duranko was an All-American and a member of Notre Dame's 1966 national champion team.

At Bishop McCort High School, he played football, ran track, and was a shot putter. He was inducted into the Pennsylvania State Hall of Fame.

Duranko earned a Master's degree from St. Francis University of Loretto, Pennsylvania.  After his playing days, he became a steel company executive.  Duranko died in 2011 from amyotrophic lateral sclerosis (ALS), which he had had since 2000. Postmortem research showed that Duranko had developed chronic traumatic encephalopathy.

See also
 List of American Football League players

References

External links
 
 Pete Duranko memorial page via Wayback Machine

1943 births
2011 deaths
American football defensive ends
American football players with chronic traumatic encephalopathy
Denver Broncos (AFL) players
Denver Broncos players
Notre Dame Fighting Irish football players
Saint Francis University alumni
Sportspeople from Johnstown, Pennsylvania
Players of American football from Pennsylvania
American people of Ukrainian descent
Neurological disease deaths in Pennsylvania
Deaths from motor neuron disease